Johnny McNicholl (born 24 September 1990) is a New Zealand born rugby union player who plays as a Winger or fullback for the Scarlets regional side in the Pro14 league and the Wales national team.

Career
McNicholl was a stand-out performer in the 2012 National Provincial Championship, heading the Top tryscorers list with 10, three ahead of his nearest rival. His consistent ability to cross the line drew interest from new Blues coach John Kirwan, but McNicholl, who played his club rugby for Sydenham in the Christchurch Metro competition, opted to commit to the Crusaders.

McNicholl was a member of the  Wider Training Squad in 2012 and subsequently promoted to the senior squad for  2013.

International
In November 2019 McNicholl was named in the Wales squad for the first time after qualifying for Wales through the residency rule. At the age of 29 he made his debut for Wales in the starting line up for the uncapped international against the Barbarians on 30 November 2019. He scored a debut try in the 44-33 Wales win. On 15 January 2020 he was also called up for Wales' 2020 Six Nations Championship squad. He made his capped debut for Wales 1 February 2020 in the starting lineup for the Six Nations 42–0 win against Italy.

References

External links 
Johnny McNicholl itsrugby.co.uk Player Statistics

Living people
1990 births
New Zealand rugby union players
Rugby union fullbacks
Rugby union wings
Canterbury rugby union players
Crusaders (rugby union) players
Rugby union players from Christchurch
Scarlets players
New Zealand expatriate rugby union players
Expatriate rugby union players in Wales
New Zealand expatriate sportspeople in Wales
Welsh rugby union players
Wales international rugby union players